Ann Charlotte Karlsson is a Swedish ski-orienteering competitor. 

She placed third overall in the World Cup in Ski Orienteering in 1989, behind Virpi Juutilainen and Ragnhild Bratberg, and ahead of Mirja Linnainmaa and Carina Östlund. She won a gold medal in the relay at the 1992 World Ski Orienteering Championships in France, together with Annika Zell and Arja Hannus.

References

Year of birth missing (living people)
Living people
Swedish orienteers
Female orienteers
Ski-orienteers